Leibniz and the Rational Order of Nature is a 1995 book about the concept of order in Leibniz's thought by Donald Rutherford.

Reception
John Whipple from University of Illinois at Chicago calls the book "one of the most important books about Leibniz" and believes that "No one has done more to explain the importance of the notion of order in Leibniz's philosophy than Donald Rutherford".

See also
Natural order (philosophy)

References

External links 
 Leibniz and the Rational Order of Nature

1995 non-fiction books
English-language books
Philosophy books
Cambridge University Press books
Works about Gottfried Wilhelm Leibniz